Aliabad (also Romanized as ‘Alīābād; also known as ‘Alīābād-e Pā’īn) is a village in Jolgeh-e Mazhan Rural District, Jolgeh-e Mazhan District, Khusf County, South Khorasan Province, Iran. At the 2006 census, its population was 50, in 12 families.

References 

Populated places in Khusf County